Jeny may refer to:

Surname
Rudolf Jeny (1901 – 1975), Hungarian football player and manager (also spelt as Jenny, Jeney or Jenei)
Given name
Jeny Velazco, Mexican Paralympian athlete
Fiction
Jeny, a character in Kiss the Girls (1965 film) played by Zoi Laskari

See also
Jeney (disambiguation)
Jenny (disambiguation)
Jenei (disambiguation)